Vitale Candiano (died 979) was the 24th doge of the Republic of Venice.

Biography
He was the fourth son of the 21st doge, Pietro III Candiano, and Arcielda Candiano (sometimes given as Richielda). His brother the 22nd Doge Pietro IV and his young heir Pietro V had been killed in the revolution. He was elected by the popular assembly in September 978. This after having to flee to Saxony because of the revolt against his father. His predecessor Pietro I Orseolo had left Venice to become a monk. He voluntarily abdicated after serving as Doge for 14 months, which allowed his niece's husband to become the next Doge.

His daughter Maria Candiano married Pietro II Orseolo.

Relationships with the empire of the West 
At times, the relationship between Venice and Western Empire was rocky because, in 976, Venetian citizens revolted and killed Doge Peter IV Candiano. He was a despotic leader, but the Western Emperor, Otto II, supported him and he was related by his second marriage to both Otto II's family and that of the King of Italy.

Abdication 
Fourteen months after being elected, Vitale Candiano abdicated, for health reasons. He withdrew to the convent of Sant'Ilario to live monastic life. He died there only four days later and was buried there.

References 

10th-century Doges of Venice
10th-century births
979 deaths
Vitale